Romance (German: Romanze) is a 1936 Austrian drama film directed by Herbert Selpin and starring Christl Mardayn, Carl Esmond and Trude Marlen.

The film's sets were designed by Julius von Borsody. The film was shot at the Rosenhügel Studios in Vienna.

Plot summary

Cast
 Christl Mardayn as Helga Leonhardt  
 Carl Esmond as Graf Eduard Romanel  
 Trude Marlen as Tänzerin (Dancer)  
 Herbert Hübner as Präsident Leonhardt  
 Rudolf Schündler as Hartwig - Sekretär  
 Fritz Imhoff 
 Annie Rosar
 Robert Valberg 
 Franz Herterich 
 Mihail Xantho 
 Richard Waldemar 
 Ernst Pröckl
 Julius Karsten 
 Josef Bergauer 
 Eugen Guenther 
 Karl Kneidinger

References

Bibliography 
 Bock, Hans-Michael & Bergfelder, Tim. The Concise CineGraph. Encyclopedia of German Cinema. Berghahn Books, 2009.

External links 
 
 

1936 films
1936 drama films
Austrian drama films
1930s German-language films
Films directed by Herbert Selpin
Films shot at Rosenhügel Studios
Austrian black-and-white films